The 1948–49 Yugoslav Second League season was the 3rd season of the Second Federal League, the second level association football competition of SFR Yugoslavia, since its establishment in 1946.

Teams
A total of ten teams contested the league, including four sides from the 1947–48 season, three clubs relegated from the 1947–48 Yugoslav First League and three sides promoted from the third tier leagues played in the 1947–48 season. The league was contested in a double round robin format, with each club playing every other club twice, for a total of 18 rounds. Two points were awarded for a win and one point for draws.

Sarajevo and Spartak Subotica were relegated from the 1947–48 Yugoslav First League after finishing in the bottom two places of the league table, while Vardar lost to Naša Krila Zemun in the relegation play-offs. The three clubs promoted to the second level were Dinamo Skopje, Podrinje Šabac and Proleter Osijek.

League table

See also
1948–49 Yugoslav First League
1948–49 Yugoslav Cup

References

Yugoslav Second League seasons
Yugo
2